Thomas Burke (1863–1914) was a Welsh international footballer who played for Wrexham Olympic and Newton Heath LYR. Burke won a total of eight caps for Wales, playing at half-back.

Burke began his career with Wrexham Grosvenor, but moved on to Wrexham February and Wrexham Olympic before making a transfer to Liverpool Cambrians. From there, he was signed by Newton Heath in 1886. The club's parent company, the Lancashire and Yorkshire Railway, was able to employ Burke as a painter – as was his trade – at the nearby Carriage and Wagon Works, from which the club had been born. In his first season at Newton Heath, Burke played mostly at left-half, but switched to right-half by the following season, and even played at centre-half or inside-right on occasion.

When Burke's time at Newton Heath came to an end, after making 29 appearances for the Heathens, he moved back to Wrexham to play for Wrexham Victoria.

He died in 1914 at the age of 50 as a result of lead poisoning.

References
Bibliography

Notes

External links
Profile at StretfordEnd.co.uk
Profile at MUFCinfo.com

1862 births
1914 deaths
Footballers from Wrexham
Welsh footballers
Wales international footballers
Wrexham A.F.C. players
Manchester United F.C. players
Football Alliance players
Association football wing halves
Wrexham Victoria F.C. players
Wrexham Grosvenor F.C. players